Campo Quijano is a town and municipality in Salta Province in northwestern Argentina.

Personalities
Richard Maury (1882-1950), engineer, buried under a monument to him in the railway station

References

External links

Populated places in Salta Province